As Long as the Roses Bloom is a 1956 West German romance film directed by Hans Deppe and starring Hertha Feiler, Gerhard Riedmann and Eva Probst.

It is a heimatfilm shot at the Spandau Studios in Berlin and on location in Austria. The film's sets were designed by the art director Willi Herrmann and Heinrich Weidemann.

Cast
 Hertha Feiler as Helga Wagner
 Gerhard Riedmann as Michael
 Eva Probst as Anna Huber
 Willy Fritsch as Richard Kühn
 Hans Moser  as Alois Lechner, Mayor
 Annie Rosar as Emerentia Huber
 Sabine Eggerth as Toni
 Ingrid Simon as Moni
 Käthe Itter as Schwester Erika
 Kurt Vespermann as Diener
 Franz Schafheitlin as Kunsthändler
 Heinz Lausch as Assistenzarzt

References

Bibliography 
 Höbusch, Harald. "Mountain of Destiny": Nanga Parbat and Its Path Into the German Imagination. Boydell & Brewer, 2016.
 Reimer, Robert C. & Reimer, Carol J. The A to Z of German Cinema. Scarecrow Press, 2010.

External links 
 

1956 films
West German films
German romance films
1950s romance films
1950s German-language films
Films directed by Hans Deppe
Constantin Film films
Films set in the Alps
Films shot at Spandau Studios
1950s German films